Tresmonte is one of six parishes (administrative divisions) in Les Regueres, a municipality within the province and autonomous community of Asturias, in northern Spain.

The population is 308 (INE 2011).

Villages
 Agüera
 Cogollu
 Granda
 Llandriu
 Les Cruces
 Pravia
 Premió

References 

Parishes in Las Regueras